The Centre Daily Times is a daily newspaper located in State College, Pennsylvania. It is the hometown newspaper for State College and the Pennsylvania State University, one of the best-known and largest universities in the country, with more than 45,000 students attending the main campus.

History
The newspaper was founded on May 12, 1898 as the weekly State College Times.  In 1901, the paper changed ownership and The Times Printing & Publishing Company was formed.  Two years later, the company name was changed to Nittany Printing & Publishing.

The Aikens family, led by Dr. Charles T. Aikens, acquired the paper in 1914.  Charles' son, Claude G. Aikens, became publisher five years later.  Under his leadership, circulation continued to grow and the paper became a daily in 1934.  At that time, the publication took on its current Centre Daily Times name.  In 1966, Claude's son Charles T. Aikens II took over as publisher. In 1973, the newspaper's headquarters and production facilities were moved from downtown State College to a new location on East College Avenue.

The paper was sold to Knight Ridder in 1979. Under Knight Ridder, a Saturday morning edition was added in 1980 and a Sunday edition was launched in 1982.  The Centre Daily Times became a morning paper in 1986.

The McClatchy Company purchased Knight Ridder in 2006, thereby acquiring the Centre Daily Times.  In 2019, the Saturday print edition was eliminated.  In 2021, the newspaper announced plans to sell its facility on East College Avenue and move to a new location.  In 2023, the delivery day and content of Sunday print editions were shifted to Saturdays.  Although the Sunday print edition was eliminated, the paper continues to offer new digital content (eEditions) seven days a week.

Circulation area
Home delivery is available to all of Centre County and parts of Blair, Clearfield, Clinton, Huntingdon and Mifflin counties. In addition, single copy sales reach several more counties, especially during college football season.

Major awards
Pennsylvania NewsMedia Association 2016 Keystone Press Awards winner as the best newspaper in its circulation division. Won 12 individual awards including first-place finishes in four categories.
Named to annual list of 10 newspapers to watch by Editor & Publisher.

References

External links

 CentreDaily.com official site
 Electronic E-Edition
 Official mobile website
 The McClatchy Company's subsidiary profile of the Centre Daily Times

Centre County, Pennsylvania
State College, Pennsylvania
Daily newspapers published in Pennsylvania
McClatchy publications
Knight Ridder